John Trent Kelly (born March 1, 1966) is an American lawyer, politician, and U.S. Army general officer from Mississippi.

Early life and career
John Trent Kelly was born on March 1, 1966, in Union, Mississippi, to John and Barbara Kelly. He is a resident of Saltillo, Mississippi, where he served as the district attorney of Mississippi's 1st Circuit Judicial District, which includes Lee, Pontotoc, Alcorn, Monroe, Itawamba, Prentiss and Tishomingo Counties.

Kelly graduated from Union High School in 1984 and joined the Mississippi Army National Guard in 1985. He earned an associate degree from East Central Community College in Decatur before graduating from the University of Mississippi with a bachelor's degree in business administration. Kelly is a member of Phi Kappa Tau fraternity.

Kelly graduated from University of Mississippi School of Law in 1994 and received a master's degree from the United States Army War College in 2010.

After law school, Kelly worked in private practice until 1999, when he became a city prosecutor in Tupelo. He was elected district attorney in 2011, defeating a nine-term Democratic incumbent.

Military service

In 1990, Kelly mobilized for Operation Desert Shield and Operation Desert Storm as a second lieutenant engineer officer. In 2005, Kelly deployed as a major during the Iraq War with the 155th Brigade as the Operations Officer of the 150th Engineer Battalion. From 2009 to 2010, he deployed as a lieutenant colonel to Iraq as the Battalion Commander of Task Force Knight of the 155th Brigade Combat Team and commanded over 670 troops from Mississippi, Ohio, and Kentucky. Kelly has received two Bronze Star Medals, the Combat Action Badge, the DeFleury Medal, and numerous other federal and state awards for his service. From October 2014 to November 2016, he served as the brigade commander for the 168th Engineer Brigade, leading 1,400 soldiers from the 223rd Engineer Battalion, the 890th Engineer Battalion, and multiple Engineer Specialty Companies from Mississippi. Kelly was promoted to brigadier general in January 2018 and to major general in November 2020. He currently serves as assistant adjutant general - Army, for the Mississippi National Guard, and the commander of the Mississippi Army National Guard.

U.S. House of Representatives

Elections

2015 special election

After the death of Republican Congressman Alan Nunnelee in 2015, Kelly entered the race to succeed him. Nunnelee's widow, Tori Nunnelee, contributed to Kelly's campaign.

In the first round, Kelly finished second in a 13-candidate field, behind Democrat Walter Zinn. As no candidate received a majority of votes, Kelly and Zinn advanced to a runoff on June 2. Several of the other candidates in the race endorsed Kelly after they were eliminated.

In the heavily Republican district, Kelly took 70% of the vote to Zinn's 30%.

2016 election
Kelly won the Republican primary in March 2016, defeating Paul Clever of Olive Branch both districtwide and in DeSoto County. Kelly had 18,152 votes in DeSoto County, or 80%, to Clever's 4,497 (20%).

Kelly then won reelection with 67.57% of the vote to Democratic nominee Jacob Owens's 27.97%, followed by Libertarian Chase Wilson's 2.92% and Reform Party candidate Cathy L. Toole's 1.45%.

Tenure
Kelly was sworn in by House Speaker John Boehner on June 9, 2015. In his first term, he served on the House Committee on Agriculture and the House Committee on Small Business.

Kelly serves on the House Armed Services Committee and the Agriculture Committee and Small Business Committee, where he serves as the chair of the Subcommittee on Investigations, Oversight, and Regulations.

In December 2020, Kelly was one of 126 Republican members of the House of Representatives to sign an amicus brief in support of Texas v. Pennsylvania, a lawsuit filed at the United States Supreme Court contesting the results of the 2020 presidential election, in which Joe Biden defeated incumbent Donald Trump. The Supreme Court declined to hear the case on the basis that Texas lacked standing under Article III of the Constitution to challenge the results of an election held by another state.

2017 congressional baseball shooting

On June 14, 2017, in Alexandria, Virginia, Republican member of Congress and House Majority Whip Steve Scalise of Louisiana was shot while practicing for the annual Congressional Baseball Game for Charity, scheduled for the following day. Also shot were David Bailey and Crystal Griner, a Capitol Police officer assigned to protect Scalise; Zack Barth, a congressional aide; and Matt Mika, a Tyson Foods lobbyist.

A ten-minute shootout ensued between the shooter—James Hodgkinson of Belleville, Illinois, a left-wing activist—and officers from the Capitol and Alexandria Police. Media reports state Hodgkinson began firing from the fence adjacent to the third base dugout. At the time of the shooting, Kelly was playing third base and roughly ten yards from Hodgkinson. As Hodgkinson opened fire, Kelly is reported to be the first person to be shot at and the first to alert the rest of the team there was an active shooter by yelling "shooter, active shooter" as he evacuated himself from the field. Officers shot Hodgkinson, who died from his wounds later that day at George Washington University Hospital. Scalise and Mika were taken to nearby hospitals, where they underwent surgery. Scalise is the first sitting member of Congress to have been shot since Representative Gabby Giffords was shot in 2011.

Committee assignments
Kelly is a member of the House Armed Services Committee, serving as Ranking Member of the Subcommittee on Intelligence and Special Operations. He also serves on the Budget and Agriculture Committees.

Caucus memberships
 Veterinary Medicine Caucus
 Republican Study Committee

Honours
  (29 August 2019, Uzbekistan)

References

External links
U.S. Representative Trent Kelly official U.S. House website
Kelly for Congress campaign website

|-

1966 births
21st-century American politicians
Methodists from Mississippi
United States Army personnel of the Gulf War
United States Army personnel of the Iraq War
American prosecutors
American Methodists
District attorneys in Mississippi
East Central Community College alumni
Living people
Mississippi lawyers
Mississippi National Guard personnel
National Guard (United States) generals
People from Saltillo, Mississippi
People from Union, Mississippi
Republican Party members of the United States House of Representatives from Mississippi
United States Army War College alumni
University of Mississippi School of Law alumni
Recipients of the Legion of Merit